This article lists computer monitor screen resolutions that are defined by standards or in common use. Most of them use certain preferred numbers.

Computer graphics

 Pixel aspect ratio (PAR) The horizontal to vertical ratio of each pixel.
 Storage aspect ratio (SAR) The horizontal to vertical ratio of solely the number of pixels in each direction.
 Display aspect ratio (DAR) The combination (which occurs by multiplication) of both the pixel aspect ratio and storage aspect ratio giving the aspect ratio as experienced by the viewer.

Television and Media 
For television, the display aspect ratio (DAR) is shown, not the storage aspect ratio (SAR); analog television does not have well-defined pixels, while several digital television standards have non-square pixels.

Analog Systems

Digital Standards 

Many of these resolutions are also used for video files that are not broadcast. The vertical resolution is usually a multiple of 8 or 16 pixels due to most video codecs processing pixels on such sized blocks.

Films

The below distinguish SAR (aspect ratio of pixel dimensions), DAR (aspect ratio of displayed image dimensions), and the corresponding PAR (aspect ratio of individual pixels), though it currently contains some errors (inconsistencies), as flagged.

Video conferencing

Notes

References

Further reading

External links
 Interactive Visualization : Screen Resolutions
 Resolutions for Common Aspect Ratios 

Resolutions
Display resolutions